Hafdaran (also Romanized as Hafdarān; also known as Haftārān, Haft Darān, Hendavān, and Khaftaran) is a village in Mavazekhan-e Shomali Rural District, Khvajeh District, Heris County, East Azerbaijan Province, Iran. At the 2006 census, its population was 130, in 35 families.

References 

Populated places in Heris County